Tairawhiti Polytechnic was a public New Zealand tertiary education institution. The main campus is based in Gisborne in the North Island. It provides full- and part-time education leading to certificates, diplomas, and applied bachelor's degrees. On 1 January 2011, Tairawhiti Polytechnic merged with Eastern Institute of Technology in Napier.

Subjects 
Programmes are offered in the following subject areas:

 Business Administration & Management
 Catering & Hospitality
 Computing & Information Technology
 Early Childhood & Adult Education
 Forestry
 Māori Studies
 Nursing
 Social Sciences
 Travel & Tourism
 Trades
 Visual Arts & Design – Toihoukura
 Viticulture & Winemaking

References

External links 
Official Tairawhiti Polytechnic website

Gisborne, New Zealand
Vocational education in New Zealand
Education in the Gisborne District